Out for Blood is the debut solo album from guitarist/vocalist Lita Ford, formerly of the band the Runaways.

The original cover art for this album featured Lita standing in front of a spiderweb holding a broken blood-spurting guitar. It was later replaced with a cover of Lita standing in front of a purple background with her guitar.

The album's artwork saw Ford adopting a very heavy metal-inspired image, an image she would maintain for much of the next decade.  
	
The track "Die for Me Only (Black Widow)" is not to be confused for the track "Black Widow" from Ford's 1991 album Dangerous Curves.

Track listing
Side one
 "Out for Blood" (Lita Ford, Neil Merryweather) – 2:56
 "Stay with Me Baby" (Ford) – 4:31
 "Just a Feeling" (Ford) – 4:41
 "Ready, Willing and Able" (Ford, Merryweather) – 2:59
 "Die for Me Only (Black Widow)" (Ford, Merryweather) – 3:05

Side two
"Rock 'n' Roll Made Me What I Am Today" (Pete Heimlich) – 2:53
 "If You Can't Live with It" (Ford) – 4:20
 "On the Run" (Ford, Merryweather) – 2:50
 "Any Way That You Want Me" (Chip Taylor) – 3:36
 "I Can't Stand It" (Ford) – 3:28

Personnel
The Lita Ford Band
 Lita Ford - lead & rhythm guitars, lead vocals
 Neil Merryweather - bass, harmony vocals, backing vocals, producer, mixing
 Dusty Watson - drums, backing vocals

Production
 Artie Ripp - producer, engineer, mixing
 Joel Soiffer - producer, engineer, mixing
 Bruce Wildstein, Cliff Zellman, John Hanlon, Laura Livingstone, Rick Neiswonger - assistant engineers
 Andrew Nicholas - mastering
 Glen Christensen - art direction
 Herbert Wheeler Worthington III - photography

References

Lita Ford albums
1983 debut albums
Mercury Records albums